Fabian Deluca (born 27 January 1987) is a former professional Australian rules footballer who played for the Port Adelaide Football Club in the Australian Football League (AFL). He was recruited from the Eastern Ranges in the TAC Cup.

He made his AFL debut in round 5, 2006 against Collingwood as a ruckman. Deluca was delisted from Port Adelaide at the conclusion of the 2008 season. His brother, Adrian, played with the Carlton Football Club from 2004 to 2006.

External links

Living people
1987 births
Australian rules footballers from Victoria (Australia)
Eastern Ranges players
Port Adelaide Football Club players
Port Adelaide Football Club players (all competitions)
Sturt Football Club players
Port Melbourne Football Club players